Edinburgh East by-election may refer to:

 1899 Edinburgh East by-election
 1909 Edinburgh East by-election
 1912 Edinburgh East by-election
 1945 Edinburgh East by-election
 1947 Edinburgh East by-election
 1954 Edinburgh East by-election